Elavenil Valarivan is a sport shooter from Cuddalore, Tamil Nadu, India. Elavenil represented India at the 2018 ISSF Junior World Cup and won a gold medal and she clinched silver in world university Games in 2019 after which she won gold at World Junior World Cup Suhl 2019. She has won first at 2019 ISSF 10-meter Air Rifle world cup on 28 August scoring 251.7 in Rio de Jenerio.

Elavenil finished fourth in the finals at the ISSF World Cup in Munich, Shooting World Cup 2019 with a score of 208.3. At the 10m air rifle Asian Air Gun Championships in Taoyuan, Taipei, she clinched her first individual gold medal in the senior category with a score of 250.5. She also won two junior World Cup gold and a silver at juniors’ 2018 World Championships.

International competition

World Championship

Junior World Cup

10 Meter Air Rifle

Mixed Team

World Cup

10 Meter Air Rifle

Awards
Ficci India Sports Award 2020

Personal life 
Valarivan lives in Ahmedabad, Gujarat.

References

External links
 

Indian female sport shooters
Living people
Tamil sportspeople
1999 births
Shooters at the 2018 Asian Games
Asian Games competitors for India
Sportswomen from Gujarat
People from Ahmedabad
Olympic shooters of India
Shooters at the 2020 Summer Olympics
21st-century Indian women
Recipients of the Arjuna Award